George Geiger Glenner (September 17, 1927 – July 12, 1995) was a senior scientist at the University of California at San Diego Medical School and co-founder of the George G. Glenner Alzheimer's Family Centers, Inc. a non-profit adult day health care center specializing in the care of Alzheimer's disease and related dementia in the United States of America.

References 

1927 births
1995 deaths
Alzheimer's disease researchers
American medical researchers